WordReference is an online translation dictionary for, among others, the language pairs English–French, English–Italian, English–Spanish, French–Spanish, Spanish–Portuguese and English–Portuguese.

WordReference formerly had Oxford Unabridged and Concise dictionaries available for a subscription. These dictionaries contained more translations than the free ones. In 2008, the price was €30 (US$) per year.

 more language pairs had been created: English–German, English–Russian, English–Polish, English–Romanian, English–Czech, English–Greek, English–Turkish, English–Chinese, English–Japanese, English–Korean, English–Arabic. Dutch, Icelandic and Swedish have since been added.

The website features publicly accessible forums allowing registered users to ask questions about vocabulary and grammar.  It also has monolingual dictionaries with definitions in English, Spanish, Italian and Catalan.

References

External links
http://www.wordreference.com

Online dictionaries